The Waipawa by-election of 1940 was a by-election for the electorate of Waipawa held on 16 November 1940 during the 26th New Zealand Parliament. The by-election resulted from the death of the previous member Albert Jull on 24 September 1940.

Background
The by-election was won by Cyril Harker, also of the National Party. The rural seat was usually safe for non-Labour parties, but in the 1935 general election had been won by Max Christie of the Labour Party. Christie lost the seat to the former holder Albert Jull in the 1938 general election.

Results
The following table gives the election results:

References

New Zealand Official Yearbook 1941 p825

Waipawa 1940
Waipawa By-Election, 1940
Politics of the Hawke's Bay Region